The Brauerei Kaiserdom (Imperial Cathedral Brewery) is a brewery in Gaustadt, a quarter of Bamberg, Germany.

History 

The brewery was founded in 1718 by Georg Morg. Since 1910, it has been managed by the Wörner family. In 1953, they brewed  liters. It is the largest brewery in Bamberg.

Products 
Kaiserdom's current lineup has 6 different kinds of beer:

 Pilsener
 Hefeweizen
 Dunkelweizen
 Kristallweizen
 Schwarzbier
 Kellerbier
 Dark Lager
 Non-alcoholic

The company also produces soft drinks.

References

External links
 Homepage of the brewery in English

1718 establishments in the Holy Roman Empire
Beer brands of Germany
Breweries in Germany
Companies based in Bavaria